Gonogenia is a genus of beetles in the family Carabidae, containing the following species:

 Gonogenia atrata (Boheman, 1848)
 Gonogenia endroedyi Basilewsky, 1980
 Gonogenia immerita (Boheman, 1860)
 Gonogenia oxygona (Chaudoir, 1844)
 Gonogenia rugosopunctata (Thunberg, 1806)
 Gonogenia spinipennis (Chaudoir, 1850)
 Gonogenia tabida (Fabricius, 1793)

References

Anthiinae (beetle)